The Breakthrough Prize in Mathematics is an annual award of the Breakthrough Prize series announced in 2013.

It is funded by Yuri Milner and Mark Zuckerberg and others. The annual award comes with a cash gift of $3 million. The Breakthrough Prize Board also selects up to three laureates for the New Horizons in Mathematics Prize which awards $100,000 to early-career researchers. Starting in 2021 (prizes announced in September 2020), the $50,000 Maryam Mirzakhani New Frontiers Prize is also awarded to a number of women mathematicians who have completed their PhDs within the past two years.

Motivation
The founders of the prize have stated that they want to help scientists to be perceived as celebrities again, and to reverse a 50-year "downward trend". They hope that this may make "more young students aspire to be scientists".

Laureates

New Horizons in Mathematics Prize
The past laureates of the New Horizons in Mathematics prize were:
2016
André Arroja Neves
Larry Guth
(prize was rejected by Peter Scholze)
2017
Geordie Williamson
Benjamin Elias
Hugo Duminil-Copin
Mohammed Abouzaid
2018
Zhiwei Yun
Wei Zhang
Maryna Viazovska
Aaron Naber
2019
Chenyang Xu
Karim Adiprasito
June Huh
Kaisa Matomäki
Maksym Radziwill
2020
Tim Austin
Emmy Murphy
Xinwen Zhu
2021
Bhargav Bhatt – "For outstanding work in commutative algebra and arithmetic algebraic geometry, particularly on the development of p-adic cohomology theories."
Aleksandr Logunov – "For novel techniques to study solutions to elliptic equations, and their application to long-standing problems in nodal geometry."
Song Sun – "For many groundbreaking contributions to complex differential geometry, including existence results for Kähler–Einstein metrics and connections with moduli questions and singularities."
2022
Aaron Brown and Sebastian Hurtado Salazar – "For contributions to the proof of Zimmer's conjecture."
Jack Thorne – "For transformative contributions to diverse areas of algebraic number theory, and in particular for the proof, in collaboration with James Newton, of the automorphy of all symmetric powers of a holomorphic modular newform."
Jacob Tsimerman – "For outstanding work in analytic number theory and arithmetic geometry, including breakthroughs on the André–Oort and Griffiths conjecture
2023
Ana Caraiani – "For diverse transformative contributions to the Langlands program, and in particular for work with Peter Scholze on the Hodge-Tate period map for Shimura varieties and its applications."
Ronen Eldan – "For the creation of the stochastic localization method, that has led to significant progress in several open problems in high-dimensional geometry and probability, including Jean Bourgain's slicing problem and the KLS conjecture."
James Maynard – "For multiple contributions to analytic number theory, and in particular to the distribution of prime numbers."

Maryam Mirzakhani New Frontiers Prize
2021
Nina Holden – "For work in random geometry, particularly on Liouville quantum gravity as a scaling limit of random triangulations."
Urmila Mahadev – "For work that addresses the fundamental question of verifying the output of a quantum computation."
Lisa Piccirillo – "For resolving the classic problem that the Conway knot is not smoothly slice."
2022
Sarah Peluse – "For contributions to arithmetic combinatorics and analytic number theory, particularly with regards to polynomial patterns in dense sets."
Hong Wang – "For advances on the restriction conjecture, the local smoothing conjecture, and related problems."
Yilin Wang – "For innovative and far-reaching work on the Loewner energy of planar curves."
2023
Maggie Miller – "For work on fibered ribbon knots and surfaces in 4-dimensional manifolds."
Jinyoung Park – "For contributions to the resolution of several major conjectures on thresholds and selector processes."
Vera Traub – "For advances in approximation results in classical combinatorial optimization problems, including the traveling salesman problem and network design."

See also
 Breakthrough Prize in Life Sciences
 Breakthrough Prize in Fundamental Physics
 List of mathematics awards

Notes

External links 
 
 Breakthrough Prize — News
 Breakthrough Prize — Mathematics Breakthrough Prize — Laureates
 Breakthrough Prize — Mathematics Breakthrough Prize — Laureates, New Horizons

Academic awards
International awards
Mathematics awards
Awards established in 2013
Russian science and technology awards
Yuri Milner